Pierre Gervais was a French sailor and Olympic champion.

Gervais competed at the 1900 Summer Olympics, where he won first prize in one of the two races in the 0-½ ton class, and obtained a third place in the other race.

References

External links
 

French male sailors (sport)
Sailors at the 1900 Summer Olympics – 0 to .5 ton
Olympic sailors of France
Olympic gold medalists for France
Year of birth missing
Year of death missing
Olympic bronze medalists for France
Olympic medalists in sailing
Place of birth missing
Place of death missing
Sailors at the 1900 Summer Olympics – Open class